Polina Sergeyevna Frolova, née Malchikova (born 1 March 1986) is a Russian ski-orienteering competitor, who was suspended for four years for doping.

Biography
She won a gold medal in the middle distance at the 2011 World Ski Orienteering Championships in Sweden, ahead of Alena Trapeznikova and Stine Olsen Kirkevik. In 2017, Frolova was found guilty of doping and therefore stripped of all medals won in 2017 and banned from competing for 4 years.

External links

References

1986 births
Living people
Russian orienteers
Female orienteers
Ski-orienteers
21st-century Russian women